Petro Kalnyshevsky (20 June 1690? – 31 October 1803) was the last Koshovyi Otaman of the Zaporozhian Host, serving in 1762 and from 1765 to 1775. Kalnyshevsky was a hero in the Russo-Turkish War of 1768–1774 for which he was awarded the Gold Medal of the Order of Saint Andrew with diamonds for courage and the rank of lieutenant-general.

Life
Being the leader of the Zaporozhian Host, Kalnyshevsky defended the rights of Cossacks and their independence from increasing Imperial Russian influence, and encouraged agricultural development and trade in the Zaporozhian steppe. After the destruction of the Zaporizhian Sich, Kalnyshevsky was arrested, tried and in July 1776 incarcerated at Solovetsky Monastery, with the strict prohibition of correspondence or socialization with anyone. In 1792, he was transferred to solitary confinement at the Povarnya jail, where he remained until 1802. When his cell was opened it was discovered that it had feces two arshins (nearly four feet) deep. Being pardoned by Emperor Alexander at the claimed age of 110 years, Kalnyshevsky (already blind at that time) decided to remain in the monastery, where he died two years later in 1803.

Canonization
Kalnyshevsky was canonized by the Orthodox Church of Ukraine in 2008. Later, he was canonized by Ukrainian Orthodox Church (Moscow Patriarchate) in 2014.

Influence

In the arts
In 2017, Roman Turovsky-Savchuk composed a tombeau in honor of Kalnyshevsky.

See also
History of the Cossacks
List of last surviving veterans of military insurgencies and wars

Sources
 Житіє праведного Петра Калнишевського, Life of Petro Kalnyshevsky on the official web-site of the Ukrainian Orthodox Church (Moscow Patriarchate), in Ukrainian. 
 Documentary film about Petro Kalnyshevsky on the official web-site of the Ukrainian Orthodox Church (Moscow Patriarchate), in Russian.
 Коцур Г. Меценатська діяльність доби козаччини: історичний досвід церковного будівництва // Науковий вісник Чернівецького університету: Зб. наук. праць. – Чернівці, 2005.
 Ефименко П.С. Калнишевскій, послъдній кошевой Запорожской Съчі. 1691 – 1803 // Русская старина. – 1875. – Т. XIV.
 Эварницкій Д.И. Послъдній кошевой атаманъ Петръ Ивановичь Калнишевскій. – Новочеркасскъ, 1887.
 Скальковський А.О. Історія Нової Січі, або останнього Коша Запорозького: Передм. та комент. Г.К.Швидько. – Дніпропетровськ, 1994.
 Голобуцкий В.А. Запорожское казачество. – К., 1957. 
 Апанович О. Розповіді про запорозьких козаків. – К., 1991.

References

Kosh Otamans
Longevity claims
People from Sumy Oblast
Year of birth uncertain
1690s births
1803 deaths
Recipients of Russian royal pardons
People of the Russo-Turkish War (1768–1774)
Inmates of Solovki prison camp
People from the Cossack Hetmanate
Eastern Orthodox saints from Ukraine